Max Pfeiffer (8 May 1881 – 5 September 1947) was a Russian-born German film producer.

Selected filmography
 Asphalt (1929)
 Princess, At Your Orders! (1931)
 Happy Days in Aranjuez (1933)
 Count Woronzeff (1934)
 Playing with Fire (1934)
 The Csardas Princess (1934)
 Make Me Happy (1935)
 The Beggar Student (1936)
 Fanny Elssler (1937)
 Lucky Kids (1937)
 Gasparone (1937)
 Seven Slaps (1937)
 Nanon (1938)
 Woman at the Wheel (1939)
 Kora Terry (1940)
 Women Are Better Diplomats (1941)
 A Wife for Three Days (1944)

References

Bibliography
 Thomas Elsaesser. Weimar Cinema and After: Germany's Historical Imaginary. Routledge, 2013.

External links

1881 births
1947 deaths
German film producers
Emigrants from the Russian Empire to Germany